The Beat is an American drama television series which was produced by Viacom Productions. It premiered on UPN on March 21, 2000, and ended after only six episodes a month later on April 25. Seven additional episodes were produced although they were never broadcast.

Premise
The series focuses on the day-to-day experiences of two uniformed police officers, Mike Dorrigan and Zane Marinelli, of the NYPD and their attempts to deal with day-to-day life with their girlfriends Elizabeth and Beatrice, and work in New York City.

Cast

Main
 Derek Cecil as Mike Dorigan
 Mark Ruffalo as Zane Marinelli 
 Heather Burns as Beatrice Felsen
 Poppy Montgomery as Elizabeth Waclawek
 Tom Noonan as Howard Schmidt 
 Lea DeLaria as Kathy Speck

Recurring
 Jeffrey Donovan as Brad Ulrich
 Lee Tergesen as Steve Dorigan
 David Zayas as Rei Morales

Production
The series was produced by many people who worked on Homicide: Life on the Street including Barry Levinson, Tom Fontana, Anya Epstein, Eric Overmyer, Irene Burns and Jim Finnerty. Many of the producers also collaborated on Oz including Barry Levinson, Tom Fontana, Irene Burns and Jim Finnerty.

The series is also notable as being one of the many series in which the character Det. John Munch, played by Richard Belzer, has appeared. The others include: Homicide: Life on the Street, Law & Order, The X-Files, Law & Order: Special Victims Unit, Law & Order: Trial by Jury, Arrested Development, and The Wire.

Episodes

References

External links 
 
 

2000s American crime drama television series
2000s American police procedural television series
2000 American television series debuts
2000 American television series endings
English-language television shows
Television series by CBS Studios
Television shows set in New York City
UPN original programming